Khaled Mahfoudh Bahah (born 1 January 1965) is a Yemeni politician and diplomat who served as Prime Minister of Yemen between 2014 and 2016, as well as Vice President of Yemen from 2015 until he was fired on April 3, 2016, by President of Yemen Abdrabbuh Mansur Hadi.

Life and career
Bahah received his BCom and MCom (1992) from Pune University in India.

In 2011, Bahah actively backed the revolution in Yemen beginning in March, demanding that President Ali Abdullah Saleh resign and avoid further bloodshed. He quit the ruling party on account of the Saleh administration's violence against its own citizens. He continued to serve as Yemeni Ambassador to Canada.

President Abdrabbuh Mansur Hadi named Bahah, then serving as Permanent Representative to the United Nations, as Prime Minister-designate on 13 October 2014, with the assent of Houthis who seized the capital the previous month. He took office as Prime Minister on 9 November 2014. However, on 22 January 2015, after heavy fighting around the presidential compound, President Hadi and Prime Minister Bahah submitted their resignations and the cabinet dissolved, leaving Yemen without a government.

Bahah was ordered to return to work by the Houthis after the House of Representatives was reinstated and Hadi escaped to Aden in late February 2015, but he and his former ministers reportedly refused. In March 2015, Bahah was released from house arrest and he immediately left Sana'a.

While in exile in Saudi Arabia during the civil war between his supporters and the Houthis, Hadi named Bahah as vice president on 12 April 2015. An aide to Hadi expressed hope that Bahah's appointment would help bring about a "political solution" to the conflict. Le Monde described Bahah as "a man of consensus" and suggested he could step in as an acceptable successor to Hadi if the Saudi-led intervention in Yemen was successful in restoring the exiled government to power.

Bahah returned to Aden with several other ministers "to stay permanently" on 16 September 2015, according to a government spokesman, amid loyalist and coalition gains in the south.

References

|-

1965 births
Ambassadors of Yemen to Canada
General People's Congress (Yemen) politicians
Hadhrami people
Living people
Prime Ministers of Yemen
Savitribai Phule Pune University alumni
Vice presidents of Yemen
Yemeni diplomats
Yemeni Sunni Muslims
Heads of government who were later imprisoned
People of the Yemeni Civil War (2014–present)
21st-century Yemeni politicians
21st-century prime ministers of Yemen
Oil and mineral ministers of Yemen
People from Hadhramaut Governorate
Politicians imprisoned during the Yemeni Civil War (2014–present)